Corrie van Brenk (born 16 September 1960) is a Dutch politician, who served as a Member of Parliament for the 50Plus party. She advocates introducing compulsory licenses for drivers of motor scooters.

References

Living people
1960 births
Members of the House of Representatives (Netherlands)
21st-century Dutch politicians
21st-century Dutch women politicians
50PLUS politicians